Fagu River may refer to:

 Valea Fagului, a tributary of the Pârâul Roșu in Olt County, Romania
 Fagu or Valea Fagului, a tributary of the Crăiasa in Bihor County, Romania

See also 
 Fagu Roșu River (disambiguation)
 Făget River (disambiguation)
 Făgețel River (disambiguation)